Lahore Junction Railway Station (Urdu) is the main railway station in Lahore, Pakistan. Construction commenced shortly after the 1857 War of Independence against British rule, and so was built in the style of a medieval castle with thick walls, turrets, and holes to direct gun and cannon fire for defence of the structure. It is located at the junction between Circular Road and Allama Iqbal Road and bounded on the north side by the old Grand Trunk Road. The station is now owned by Pakistan Railways, and also serves as its headquarters.

History

The station was built during the colonial era, and was built just outside the Walled City at the intersection of Empress Road, Allama Iqbal Road and Circular Road. Lahore Junction station was constructed by Mian Mohammad Sultan Chughtai, a former official of the Mughal Empire, between 1859 and 1860.

The station was also a witness to a brutal lathi charge in British era that took place on 30 October 1928 near the premises of the junction when Indian leader Lala Lajpat Rai had led a protest march against the Simon Commission that had come to Lahore to discuss political reforms in the town. Rai was beaten by a wooden baton by the then Police Superintendent of Lahore and was badly wounded. Rai later died of his injuries on 17 November.

The station served as the headquarters for the Punjab Railway and later would serve as the northern terminus of the Scinde, Punjab & Delhi Railway, which connected the port city of Karachi to Lahore. The nearby Dai Anga Mosque was also converted into offices for the railways at this time. The station was built in the style of a medieval castle to ward off any potential future uprisings, as seen in the Sepoy Mutiny of 1857, with thick walls, turrets, and holes to direct gun and cannon fire for defense of the structure.

The station is a legacy of the extensive railway network established during the British Raj, and reflects the British contribution to the region's infrastructure. The station was severely affected during the riots which followed the Partition of the British Indian Empire and the independence of Pakistan in 1947. Similar to the contemporaneous situation of Muslims fleeing Delhi and Amritsar, Lahore's Hindus and Sikhs were sometimes attacked at Lahore's train station.

Facilities
Lahore Junction Station is equipped with all basic facilities such as ticketing services, restrooms, waiting areas, and international fast food chains. The station has current and advance reservation offices for Pakistan Railways, as well as freight and parcel facilities. Retail shops are found mainly on platforms 1 and 2, including restaurants such as Pizza Hut and McDonald's, in addition to restaurants offering Pakistani cuisine.

Services
These trains serve Lahore Junction station:

Gallery

See also 
 Pakistan Railways
 List of railway stations in Pakistan

References

External links 

 Pakistan Railways official site
 A short history of Lahore railway station

Buildings and structures in Lahore
Lahore Metro
Railway stations in Lahore District
Railway stations opened in 1860
Transport in Lahore
Railway stations on Lahore–Wagah Branch Line
Railway stations on Karachi–Peshawar Line (ML 1)